German submarine U-763 was a Type VIIC U-boat built for Nazi Germany's Kriegsmarine for service during World War II.
She was laid down on 21 January 1941 by Kriegsmarinewerft Wilhelmshaven as yard number 146, launched on 16 January 1943 and commissioned on 13 March 1943 under Oberleutnant zur See Ernst Cordes. On 1 November 1944, Oberleutnant zur See Karl-Heinz Schröter took over command as part of her transfer to 24th Flotilla..

Design
German Type VIIC submarines were preceded by the shorter Type VIIB submarines. U-763 had a displacement of  when at the surface and  while submerged. She had two shafts and two  propellers.

U-763 was fitted with five  torpedo tubes (four fitted at the bow and one at the stern), fourteen torpedoes, one  SK C/35 naval gun, 220 rounds, and two twin  C/30 anti-aircraft guns. The boat had a complement of between forty-four and sixty.

Service history
The boat's career began with training at 8th U-boat Flotilla on 13 March 1943, followed by active service on 1 November 1943 as part of the 3rd Flotilla. When the situation deteriorated for the Germans in France, on 1 October 1944, following the invasion, she transferred to 33rd Flotilla in Flensburg, but stayed only one month. On 1 November 1944 she transferred to 24th Flotilla for training.

4/5 February 1944
On 4 February 1944, U-763 shot down a RAF Liberator bomber of 53 Squadron in the Bay of Biscay.
On the following day, she successfully warded off three separate air attacks by the RAF, resulting in damage to a Liberator of 53 Squadron, a Wellington bomber of 172 Squadron and the loss of a Halifax bomber from 502 Squadron

Wolfpacks
U-763 took part in one wolfpack, namely:
 Rügen 3 (28 – 31 December 1943)

Fate
U-763 was scuttled on 29 January 1945 in the Schichau-Werke shipyard, Königsberg in position  after being damaged in a Soviet air raid.

Summary of raiding history

References

Bibliography

External links

German Type VIIC submarines
1943 ships
U-boats commissioned in 1943
U-boats sunk in 1945
World War II submarines of Germany
Ships built in Wilhelmshaven
Maritime incidents in January 1945